Andrew Fisher (1862–1928) was an Australian politician.

Andrew Fisher or Andy Fisher may also refer to:

 Andrew Fisher (MP), MP for Aldborough (UK Parliament constituency) 1593–1597
 Andrew Fisher (political activist) (born 1979), former policy advisor to Jeremy Corbyn
 Andrew Fisher (physicist), professor of physics
 Andrew Fisher (Scrabble), Scrabble player
 Andrew Fisher (Shazam), executive chairman of Shazam
 Andrew Fisher (sprinter) (born 1991), Jamaican-born Bahraini athlete
 Andy Fisher (rugby league) (born 1967), rugby league footballer and coach
 Andy Fisher (footballer) (born 1998), British footballer

See also
 Andrew Fischer (disambiguation)